Nuestra Belleza Latina 2014 was the eight season of Nuestra Belleza Latina and the eighth season to be aired on Univision. The season premiere was on Sunday February 16, 2014 at 8pm/7c, the earliest premiere of all eight seasons. The season finale was on Sunday, May 18, 2014.

The auditions will be shown Sundays, prior to the final 12 are revealed. Auditions were held from December 2013 through January 2014 in five major US cities (Miami, Florida; Chicago, Illinois; New York City, New York; San Antonio, Texas; Los Angeles, California) and in San Juan, Puerto Rico with also Online Castings available. During the audition process, 60 young women were given passes to the semi-finals in Miami. Two contestants were chosen from online Auditions, with the help of public votes.

The winner of the contest will be awarded a contract to be one of the new personality faces on many of Univision's programs and award shows and a chance to win $200,000 in cash and prizes; a prize reduction from previous four seasons and back to its original format. In addition, she will appear on the cover of Cosmopolitan en Español magazine. She will also be a host for Sabado Gigante and reign as Nuestra Belleza Latina for 2014.

The winner of Nuestra Belleza Latina 2014 is Aleyda Ortiz from Puerto Rico.

2014 Judges

2014 contestants

Contestant Chart

Top 12 Contestants Notes
 Alina Robert has won several beauty pageants including Miss Latinoamérica 2012 representing Cuba, Miss Cuban American 2012 and Reina Mundial de los Carnavales 2012. She also represented Cuba at Miss Caribbean World 2012 where she finished as 3rd runner up. She also made it to the Top 18 in Nuestra Belleza Latina 2013.
 Nabila Tapia won Miss Turismo Dominicana 2010 and Miss Teen Dominican Republic 2009. She represented Dominican Republic at Miss Teen International 2010 where she finished as 2nd runner up.
 Josephine Ochoa won Miss Guatemala U.S. 2013.
 Aly Villegas worked as an entertainment news reporter and TV host of the show "La Aficcion" in Mexico.
 Maria Delgado made it to the Top 75 in Nuestra Belleza Latina 2013.
 Maria Elena Anaya was a finalist in Univision's Miss Republica Deportiva 2010. She also made it to the Top 20 in Nuestra Belleza Latina 2009.
 Prissila Sanchez is a well-known TV host and weather reporter at channel Info 7 on the Azteca network. 
 / Yesenia Hernandez won Miss HispanoAmerica Illinois 2012.
 Aleyda Ortiz was 1st runner up at Miss Universe Puerto Rico 2014 and represented Puerto Rico at Miss Intercontinental 2013 where she won Best in Swimwear and Best Smile. She made it to the Top 5 and finished as 1st runner up.
 Gabriela Alvarez won Chica Venezuela USA 2006.

Winners

References

Sources
 https://web.archive.org/web/20100317141801/http://foro.univision.com/univision/board?board.id=bellezalatina
 http://video.aol.fr/video-detail/nuestra-belleza-latina-2010/784361480/?icid=VIDURV12
 http://network.nshp.org/events/nuestra-belleza-latina-2010-1
 https://web.archive.org/web/20110218104928/http://mipagina.univision.com/nuestrabelleza
 http://foro.univision.com/t5/Nuestra-Belleza-Latina/MIREN-NUESTRA-BELLEZA-LATINA-2011/m-p/389909861

External links 
 Nuestra Belleza Latina at Univision.com 
 

Univision original programming
2014 American television series debuts
Nuestra Belleza Latina